The Clean Up may refer to:
 The Clean-Up (1917 film), an American silent comedy western film directed by William Worthington
 The Clean Up (1923 film), an American silent comedy film directed by William Parke
 The Clean Up (1929 film), an American silent drama film directed by Bernard McEveety